11 Andromedae, abbreviated 11 And, is a single, orange-hued star in the northern constellation of Andromeda. 11 Andromedae is the Flamsteed designation. It has an apparent visual magnitude of 5.44, which is bright enough to be faintly visible to the naked eye. An annual parallax shift of  yields a distance estimate of 283 light years. It is moving further from the Earth with a heliocentric radial velocity of +10 km/s.

This is an evolved giant star with a stellar classification of K0 III, which means it has exhausted the supply of hydrogen at its core and turned off the main sequence. It has an estimated 2.57 times the mass of the Sun and has expanded to around 12 times the Sun's radius. It is radiating 63 times the Sun's luminosity from its enlarged photosphere at an effective temperature of 4,874 km/s.

Within Andromeda it is the south-west end of a bright northerly chain (jagged line) asterism – the others being, their order going with numbering, 8, 7, 5 and 3 Andromedae.

References

K-type giants
Andromeda (constellation)
BD+47 4110
Andromedae, 11
219945
115152
8874